Ratbot is a future soul band from Mexico City formed in 2011. They have released three EPs featuring a sound influenced by R&B, hip hop, house, and various electronic genres.

In 2013, the band recorded at Converse Rubber Tracks Studios in Mexico City and they were also part of Converse Rubber Tracks Live playing with Phantogram and local bands Acidandali and Rey Pila.

In 2014 Ratbot played at Festival Marvin  and Carnaval de Bahidorá.

Discography 

Extended plays

References

External links 
 http://ratbot.tv/

Musical groups from Mexico City
Musical groups established in 2011
2011 establishments in Mexico